Saud bin Muhammad Al Muqrin ( Suʿūd ibn Muḥammad Āl Muqrin; 1640–1726) was the eponymous ancestor of the House of Saud, otherwise known as the Al Saud.

Biography
Saud was from the family of Al Muqrin that traces its origin to the Arabian tribe of 'Amir ibn Saasaa. Saud was the leader of the oasis of Diriyah from 1720 to 1726.

The Al Saud originated as a leading family in a town called Diriyah, close to the modern city of Riyadh, near the center of Najd. Sometime in the early 16th century, ancestors of Saud bin Muhammad took over some date groves, one of the few forms of agriculture the area could support, and settled there. Over time, the groves grew into a small town, and the clan came to be recognized as its leaders.

Two decades after his death, Saud's son Muhammad ibn Saud made his historic pact with Muhammad ibn Abd al-Wahhab, leading to their conquest of Arabia and the establishments of the First Saudi State. Sheikh Muhammad's patronymic "Ibn Saud" eventually gave the clan its name of Al Saud.

Saud had other sons, Thunayyan, Mishari and Farhan. He died in 1726 and was succeeded by his son, Muhammad. However, one of Saud's brothers, Muqrin, was killed by Muhammad bin Saud which caused an intrafamilial struggle and therefore, Zaid bin Farhan found an opportunity to control the rule of Diriyah.

References

17th-century monarchs in the Middle East
18th-century monarchs in the Middle East
18th-century imams
1640 births
1726 deaths
Saud bin Mohammed